Guanine nucleotide exchange factor DBS is a protein that in humans is encoded by the MCF2L gene.

Model organisms 

Model organisms have been used in the study of MCF2L function. A conditional knockout mouse line called Mcf2ltm1a(EUCOMM)Hmgu was generated at the Wellcome Trust Sanger Institute. Male and female animals underwent a standardized phenotypic screen to determine the effects of deletion. Additional screens performed:  - In-depth immunological phenotyping

References

Further reading